Norman Earl Banks was an American baseball third baseman in the Negro leagues. He played with the Newark Eagles in 1945.

References

External links
 and Seamheads 

Newark Eagles players
Year of birth missing
Year of death missing
Baseball third basemen